State Route 520 (SR 520) is an east–west state highway in the central part of Ohio. SR 520 provides access to the village of Glenmont.

Route description

State Route 520 runs exclusively within the southwestern quadrant of Holmes County.  The highway is not a part of the National Highway System, a network of highways classified as the most important to the nation's economy, mobility and defense.

History
Established in 1937 along the path that it currently maintains within Holmes County between State Route 514 and U.S. Route 62, State Route 520 has not experienced any major changes to its routing throughout its history.

Major intersections

References

External links

520
Transportation in Holmes County, Ohio